The bishops of Cameroon are the National Episcopal Conference of Cameroon (French: Episcopal Conférence Nationale du Cameroun, CENC). The origins date back to the missionaries of the Episcopal Conference. In fact, the missionaries were the first to Pallottines feel the need to meet to discuss issues related to the evangelization of the country. The CENC is a member of the Association of Regional Conferences of the Region of Central Africa and Symposium of Episcopal Conferences of Africa and Madagascar (SECAM).

History

In September 1906 in Douala gathered vicars apostolic and missionary in Cameroon than in a missionary synod, which was repeated at the beginning of 1914. The First World War and the expulsion of the German missionaries from the country, the outlook changed. In fact the mission in Cameroon, after the world war, was divided in two: the missions depended Anglophone Nigeria, while the Francophone Central Africa. In June 1949, held in Yaounde, the first plenary lecture of the Ordinaries of the missions of the French-speaking Cameroon: five bishops took part under the chairmanship of the Apostolic Delegate. A second conference, this time with all the ordinaries of the country, was held in Nkongsamba in April 1955: by this time the meetings were held regularly apostolic vicars. The Second Vatican Council gave great impetus to the formation of the episcopal conferences: the Cameroonian bishops met several times in Rome, on November 24, 1962 and officially founded the Episcopal Conference of Cameroon, who today took the official name in 1972 to its constitution, drawn up already this year, were approved by the Holy See in 1986.

List of presidents of the Bishops' Conference

1962-1976: Jean Zoa, Archbishop of Yaoundé

1976-1982: Paul Verdzekov, Archbishop of Bamenda

1982-1985: Jean Zoa, Archbishop of Yaoundé

1985-1991: Christian Wiyghan Tumi, Archbishop of Garoua

1991-1994: Jean-Baptiste Ama, Bishop of Ebolowa-Kribi

1994-2000: André Wouking, Bishop of Bafoussam and Archbishop of Yaoundé

2000-2004: Cornelius Fontem Esua, Bishop of Kumbo

2004 - ... Simon-Victor Tonyé Bakot, Archbishop of Yaoundé

See also
Episcopal conference
Catholic Church in Cameroon

References

External links
 http://www.cenc.cm/
 http://www.leffortcamerounais.com/
 http://www.gcatholic.org/dioceses/country/CM.htm
 http://www.catholic-hierarchy.org/country/cm.html 

Cameroon
Catholic Church in Cameroon
Organizations established in 1962

it:Chiesa cattolica in Camerun#Conferenza episcopale